The pale-bellied hermit (Phaethornis anthophilus) is a species of hummingbird in the family Trochilidae. It is found in Colombia, Panama, and Venezuela.

Taxonomy and systematics

Though the scale-throated hermit is a member of the large genus Phaethornis it seems to have no close relatives, and at one time was placed in its own genus, Ametrornis. It has two subspecies, the nominate P. a. anthophilus and P. a. hyalinus. It has been suggested that a third subspecies, P. a. fuscicapillus, be split from anthophilus. A putative subspecies P. a. fuliginosus was based on a melanistic morph that as of 2021 had not been identified to species.

Description

Males weigh  and females . This medium-sized hermit has dark 
green to olive green upperparts and light gray underparts. The face has a black "mask" with a buffy supercilium and a mostly white throat. The male's bill is almost straight and the female's is decurved. P. a. hyalinus has more bluish green upperparts and paler underparts than the nominate. Members of the suggested P. a. fuscicapillus have shorter wings and bills than the rest of the nominate.

Distribution and habitat

The nominate subspecies of pale-bellied hermit taken as a whole is found in central Panama; northern, central, and eastern Colombia; and western and northern Venezuela. The suggested P. a. fuscicapillus is the population in Colombia's Eastern Andes and possibly includes the Venezuelan population as well. P. a. hyalinus is found only on the Pearl Islands off the Pacific coast of Panama.

The pale-bellied hermit mostly inhabits semi-deciduous forest and also drier woodland, secondary forest, gallery forest, plantations, and brushy and thorny landscapes.

Behavior

Movement

Observations of pale-bellied hermits in northeastern Venezuela hint at regular movements but more data are needed.

Feeding

The pale-bellied hermit is a "trap-line" feeder like other hermit hummingbirds, visiting a circuit of a wide variety of flowering plants for nectar. It also consumes small arthropods.

Breeding

The pale-bellied hermit's breeding seasons appear to vary across its range but have not been fully defined. It suspends a cone-shaped nest under a drooping leaf like many other species of its genus. Its clutch size is two eggs.

Vocalization

The pale-bellied hermit's song has not been well described. Its calls are "rather piercing, high-pitched notes".

Status

The IUCN has assessed the pale-bellied hermit as being of Least Concern, though its population size and trend are unknown. It is uncommon to locally common in most of its range, abundant in a few regions, and occurs in several protected areas.

References

External links
 Images of Pale-bellied Hermit – Phaethornis anthophilus

pale-bellied hermit
Birds of Mexico
Birds of Panama
Birds of Colombia
Birds of Venezuela
pale-bellied hermit
Taxonomy articles created by Polbot